La Mata de los Olmos is a municipality located in the Bajo Aragón comarca, province of Teruel, Aragon, Spain. According to the 2018 census the municipality has a population of 265 inhabitants.

Road N-211 crosses the eastern side of La Mata de los Olmos.

See also
Bajo Aragón
List of municipalities in Teruel

References

Municipalities in the Province of Teruel